Israel originally planned to participate in the Eurovision Song Contest 2020. The Israeli broadcaster Israeli Public Broadcasting Corporation (IPBC/) collaborated with the commercial broadcaster Keshet and Tedy Productions, which organisied the reality singing competition  ("The Next Star for Eurovision"). The competition was won by Eden Alene, with a separate national final,  ("The Next Song for Eurovision"), held to select her entry "Feker Libi". However, the contest was cancelled due to the COVID-19 pandemic.

Background 

Prior to the 2020 Contest, Israel had participated in the Eurovision Song Contest forty-two times since its first entry in 1973. Israel has won the contest on four occasions: in 1978 with the song "" performed by Izhar Cohen and the Alphabeta, in 1979 with the song "" performed by Milk and Honey, in 1998 with the song "" performed by Dana International and in 2018 with the song "Toy" performed by Netta Barzilai. Since the introduction of the semi-finals in 2004, Israel has failed to reach the final six times. In , Shiri Maimon gave the country its tenth top five result, finishing fourth. Israel's fourth victory came when Netta won the  contest in Lisbon, with the song "Toy". , when the contest was held in Tel Aviv, Kobi Marimi represented the country on home soil with the song "Home", finishing twenty-third with 35 points in the final.

The Israeli entry for the 2020 contest was selected through the reality singing competition  ("The Next Star for Eurovision"), which was organised by Keshet and Tedy Productions. This was the fifth time that the Israeli entry was selected through a collaboration with Keshet and Tedy Productions. An additional show also enabled the public to select the song that the Israeli representative will sing, which had previously been selected internally.

Before Eurovision

HaKokhav HaBa L'Eurovizion 
The singer who will perform the Israeli entry for the Eurovision Song Contest 2020 was selected through the reality singing competition  ("The Next Star for Eurovision"), the original version of the international format Rising Star produced by Tedy Productions and Keshet Media Group.  has been used since 2015 to select the Israeli artist for Eurovision. The shows were hosted by Assi Azar and Rotem Sela and featured a judging panel composed of Asaf Amdursky, Keren Peles, Shiri Maimon (2005 Israeli Eurovision entrant), Static & Ben-El Tavori and Itay Levi.

The competition commenced on 20 November 2019. All shows in the competition were broadcast on Keshet 12 as well as online via mako.co.il.

Shows

Auditions 
The auditions were broadcast between 20 November and 18 December 2019. In total, 59 contestants qualified for the next phase of the competition following the withdrawal of Itzik Shamli, one of the previously qualified contestants.

Among the contestants were Ohad Shragai, a finalist of Kokhav Nolad season 8 and one of the composers behind "Home", the Israeli entry in 2019; Eden Alene, the winner of the X Factor Israel season 3; Moran Aharoni, a competitor of Kokhav Nolad season 4; Nicki Goldstein, a comedian who participated in the 2011 and 2013 Israeli national finals; Lihi Toledano, the daughter of the 1982 Israeli representative Avi Toledano; Daniel Ben-Haim, a competitor of Kokhav Nolad season 5; Eddie, a competitor of The Voice Israel season 1,;Judah Gavra, who participated in the 2013 Israeli and 2018 Sammarinese national finals; and Liora Itzhak, an Indian-born singer.

Shefita ,who placed third in the 2019 Israeli national final, performed as two different characters during the auditions and the shortlisting rounds and withdrew from the competition after her performances.

Shortlisting rounds

Top 20 round

Elimination shows

Heat 1

Heat 2

Heat 3

Heat 4 – Idan Raichel special 
In this round every contestant performed together with Idan Raichel who performed as an interval act during the Grand Final of the Eurovision Song Contest 2019.

Heat 5

Quarter-final

Semi-final 1

Semi-final 2

Final 
The final took place on 4 February 2020 and consisted of two rounds.

In the first round the four finalists were paired in two duels. From each duel the contestant with the higher score advanced to the second round. At the end of the first round, one of the remaining two contestants was saved by the viewers and the other contestant was eliminated.

The remaining three contestants were paired in a third duel in the second round. At the end of the duel, each judge allocated twelve points to their favourite, ten points to their runner-up and eight points to their least favourite. In addition to the votes of the judges, 300 points in proportion to the votes of the audience were also allocated to the three contestants. In the end, the contestant with the highest number of points won the competition.

Additionally, four thematical jury groups were asked to vote by the same method. The members of the four jury groups were:

 Group 1: Judges of the talent show  – Gal Uchovsky, Margalit Tzan'ani, Tzedi Tzarfati
 Group 2: Israeli representative and winner of the Eurovision Song Contest 2018 – Netta Barzilai
 Group 3: Composers of former Israeli Eurovision winning entries – Kobi Oshrat ("Hallelujah", 1979), Yoav Ginai, Svika Pick ("Diva", 1998)
 Group 4: Israeli composers – Stav Beger ("Toy", 2018), Jordi

HaShir HaBa L'Eurovizion 
The song that Alene performed at Eurovision was decided by a national final,  ("The Next Song for Eurovision"), featuring a total of four songs. The four song titles and songwriting teams were announced on 27 February 2020.

Final 
The final was held on 3 March 2020 and hosted by Lucy Ayoub. All songs were performed by Eden Alene and the winning song was chosen by a combination of the votes from two in-studio jury groups (10%), a professional jury (50%) and televoting (40%).

At Eurovision 
According to Eurovision rules, all nations with the exceptions of the host country and the "Big Five" (France, Germany, Italy, Spain and the United Kingdom) are required to qualify from one of two semi-finals in order to compete for the final; the top ten countries from each semi-final progress to the final. The European Broadcasting Union (EBU) split up the competing countries into six different pots based on voting patterns from previous contests, with countries with favourable voting histories put into the same pot. On 28 January 2020, a special allocation draw was held which placed each country into one of the two semi-finals, as well as which half of the show they would perform in. Israel was placed into the first semi-final, to be held on 12 May 2020, and was scheduled to perform in the second half of the show. However, due to the COVID-19 pandemic, the contest was cancelled.

Notes and references

Notes

References 

2020
Countries in the Eurovision Song Contest 2020
Eurovision